Hartford is an unincorporated community located within Mount Laurel Township, in Burlington County, New Jersey, United States. Rowan College at Burlington County's Mount Laurel Campus is located in Hartford, on Route 38 between Hartford Road and Briggs Road.

Transportation
Hartford is located near some major roads, including County Route 537 and Route 38. Exit 40 on I-295 and exit 4 on the Turnpike provide the closest access to Hartford.

New Jersey Transit provides bus service to and from Philadelphia on the 317 and 413 routes.

References

Mount Laurel, New Jersey
Unincorporated communities in Burlington County, New Jersey
Unincorporated communities in New Jersey